Ibrahim Bayesh Kamil Al-Kaabawi (born 1 May 2000) is an Iraqi professional footballer who plays as a midfielder for the Iraqi Premier League club Al-Quwa Al-Jawiya and the Iraq national team.

Career statistics

International goals
Scores and results list Iraq's goal tally first.

Honours

Club
Al-Zawraa
Iraqi Premier League: 2017–18
Iraqi Super Cup: 2017
Al-Quwa Al-Jawiya
Iraqi Premier League: 2020–21
Iraq FA Cup: 2020–21
AFC Cup: 2018

International
Iraq
Arabian Gulf Cup: 2023

Individual
Arabian Gulf Cup best player: 2023
Arabian Gulf Cup joint top scorer: 2023

References

External links
 

2000 births
Living people
Iraqi footballers
Association football midfielders
Sportspeople from Baghdad
AFC Cup winning players
Iraq international footballers